Concerts that were held at the National Stadium, Cardiff Arms Park, Cardiff, Wales, between 1987 and 1996 and included U2, Bon Jovi, Michael Jackson and The Rolling Stones. The last concert at the stadium was performed by Tina Turner on 14 July 1996. In 1997 the National Stadium was demolished to make way for the Millennium Stadium.

Concerts

See also 
 Music of Cardiff
 List of concerts at the Millennium Stadium
 List of events held at the Millennium Stadium

References 

Lists of music venues
Events in Cardiff
Music in Cardiff
Concerts at National Stadium, Cardiff Arms Park
British music-related lists
Lists of events by venue
Concerts at National Stadium, Cardiff Arms Park